Karasht is a village in, and the capital of, Karasht Rural District of the Central District of Pardis County, Tehran province, Iran. At the 2006 National Census, its population was 1,528 in 399 households, when it was in Siyahrud Rural District of the Central District of Tehran County.

The following census in 2011 counted 919 people in 255 households. The latest census in 2016 showed a population of 1,785 people in 531 households, by which time the village was in Karasht Rural District of Bumehen District in the newly established Pardis County. After the census, the Central District was established by separating the rural district and the city of Pardis from Bumahen District, and Karasht became the capital of the newly established Karasht Rural District therein.

References 

Pardis County

Populated places in Tehran Province

Populated places in Pardis County